Vet du vad jag vet is a 1994 studio album from Kikki Danielsson & Roosarna. In 1995 the album was awarded a Grammis for best dansband album of 1994. At Svensktoppen, the songs "Långt bortom bergen" and "Vet du vad jag vet" managed to enter the chart.

Track listing

References 

1994 albums
Roosarna albums